Greatest Maksim is the eighth studio album by Maksim Mrvica.  EMI released the album on 23 March 2008.

Track listing
 "New World Concerto" (Antonín Dvořák)
 "Wonderland" (Tonči Huljić)
 "Merry Christmas Mr. Lawrence" (Sakamoto / Matt Dunkley)
 "Croatian Rhapsody" (Tonči Huljić)
 "Kolibre" (Tonči Huljić)
 "Chopin's Revolutionary Etude in C Minor" (Chopin)
 "Nocturne in E flat major Op.9, No.2" (Chopin / Tolga Kashif)
 "Nostradamus" (Tonči Huljić)
 "Piano Concerto No.1 in B flat minor, 3rd movement" (Tchaikovsky / Matt Dunkley)
 "Totentanz" (Franz Liszt / Matt Dunkley)
 "Nocturne no.20 in C Sharp Minor" (Chopin)
 "Child in Paradise" (Tonči Huljić / arr. Eduard Botric)
 "Requiem" (Giuseppe Verdi / arr. Julian Kershaw)
 "Flight of the Bumblebee" (Rimsky-Korsakov)
 "Bohemian Rhapsody" (Freddie Mercury / Tolga Kashif)
 "The Gypsy Maid" (Giuseppe Verdi / arr. Matt Robertson)
 "Greig's Concerto in A Minor" (Greig / arr. Ian Wherry)
 "Somewhere In Time" / "The Old Woman" (John Barry)

References

External links
"Greatest Maksim"

2008 albums
Maksim Mrvica albums
Classical crossover albums